İkinci Yeniyol (also, Yeniyël Vtoroye) is a village in the Ismailli Rayon of Azerbaijan.   The village forms part of the municipality of Birinci Yeniyol.

References 

Populated places in Ismayilli District